Gareth Russell is a Northern Irish historian, author, and broadcaster. 
He is the host of the podcast Single malt history with Gareth Russell. He lives in Belfast is a historian. Is a author of several books.

Early life and education
Gareth Russell was born in Belfast, Northern Ireland. He attended Down High Grammar School, and later graduated from Saint Peter's College, Oxford, where he studied modern history. Russell completed a Master's degree in medieval history at Queen's University, Belfast. He currently divides his time between Belfast and New York.

Career
Russell is the author of a series of plays. In July 2011, his first novel Popular was published by Penguin, as the first in a new series of novels following the lives of a group of Belfast teenagers. It was published in German in 2014. A sequel to Popular, titled The Immaculate Deception, was published in November 2012. Both novels were subsequently adapted for the stage in Northern Ireland, followed by a final theatrical sequel, Say You'll Remember Me, which received its first performance in 2016.

In August 2014, Russell's first non-fiction book, The Emperors: How Europe's Rulers were Destroyed by World War One, was published by Amberley Publishing. In 2017, his biography of English queen consort Catherine Howard was published, based on research undertaken between 2010 and 2016. It was published by Simon & Schuster in the US and Canada, and HarperCollins in the UK, Ireland, and most of the Commonwealth. It was a finalist for the Slightly Foxed Best First Biography award in 2017, which was won that year by Edmund Gordon's biography of Angela Carter. In 2019, his account of the Titanic disaster was published. It was named a Book of the Year by The Times and a Best History Book of 2019 by The Daily Telegraph. 

In 2022, his biography of Queen Elizabeth the Queen Mother was published. It was his second book to become a Times Book of the Year. 

Russell is currently working on a history of Hampton Court Palace and its occupants.

Bibliography

Novels
 Popular (2011)
 The Immaculate Deception (2012)

Non-Fiction
 The Emperors: How Europe's Rulers were destroyed by World War I (2014)
 An Illustrated Introduction to the Tudors (2014)
 A History of the English Monarchy from Boadicea to Elizabeth I (2015)
 Young and Damned and Fair: The Life of Catherine Howard, Fifth Wife of King Henry VIII (US title) (2017)
In the UK, this book's subtitle is The Life and Tragedy of Catherine Howard at the Court of Henry VIII
  The Ship of Dreams: The Sinking of the Titanic and the End of the Edwardian Era (2019), originally published as The Darksome Bounds of a Failing World in the UK and Ireland
 Do Let's Have Another Drink: The Singular Wit and Double Measures of Queen Elizabeth the Queen Mother (2022). In the US and Canada, the book is Do Let's Have Another Drink: The Dry Wit and Fizzy Life of Queen Elizabeth the Queen Mother.

Notes

References

External links
 Gareth Russell Author's page

Male novelists from Northern Ireland
Writers from Belfast
Living people
People educated at Down High School
Alumni of St Peter's College, Oxford
Year of birth missing (living people)